Huda Kattan (born October 2, 1983) is an American makeup artist, beauty blogger, and entrepreneur. She is the founder of the cosmetics line Huda Beauty.

Early life 
Huda Kattan was born on October 2, 1983, in Oklahoma City, Oklahoma, as one of four children. Her parents are both from Iraq. The family later moved to Cookeville, Tennessee, and then to Dartmouth, Massachusetts. Kattan attended the University of Michigan–Dearborn where she majored in finance.

Career 
In 2006, Kattan moved to Dubai with her father because he accepted a job opportunity as a teacher in the emirate. A few years later, Kattan moved to Los Angeles, where she studied makeup. Among her clients were celebrities such as Eva Longoria and Nicole Richie. Kattan then returned to Dubai where she became employed by Revlon as a makeup artist. In April 2010, upon the advice of one of her sisters, Kattan started a beauty-related WordPress blog which she named "Huda Beauty" on which she would post makeup tutorials and tips.

In 2013, Kattan founded a cosmetics line which, like her blog, is also called "Huda Beauty." Her first product, a series of false eyelashes, was released through Sephora. The Huda Beauty label achieved success with the sales of the false eyelashes, which were famously worn by Kim Kardashian.

Huda's company, which is based in Dubai, later began to offer other beauty products, including eye shadow palettes, liquid lipsticks, lip liners, highlighter palettes, foundations, concealers, baking powders and liquid eyeshadows.

Kattan achieved popularity on Instagram, attaining more than 47 million followers as of 2020. Kattan is ranked #1 on the "2017 Influencer Instagram Rich List", earning $18,000 for each post of sponsored content. Kattan has been described as "a Kim Kardashian West of the beauty influencer economy", and was declared one of the "ten most powerful influencers in the world of beauty" by Forbes magazine. She was chosen as one of "The 25 Most Influential People on the Internet" by Time magazine in 2017. In 2020, Kattan was listed on Fortunes 40 under 40 In 2021, Kattan was ranked number one on cosmetify Beauty Influencer Rich List.

In 2018, Kattan began starring in her own original Facebook Watch reality series entitled Huda Boss, alongside her family.

In 2021, Kattan participated in a campaign to provide food and donated one million meals through her cosmetics company Huda Beauty.

Philanthropy and activism 
Through her cosmetics brand, Huda Beauty, Kattan has participated in various philanthropic efforts. In June 2020, Kattan announced that Huda Beauty will donate $500,000 dollars to the NAACP Legal Defense and Educational Fund. 

In 2021, Kattan and Huda Beauty started a petition for beauty brands to disclose when they've retouched or edited their images or videos, to help dismantle "toxic" social media beauty standards. Through her beauty brand, she has also supported the Asian American community, Médecins Sans Frontières (Doctors Without Borders) and food drive initiatives such as 100 Million Meals. Kattan has also used her social media platforms to speak up about the forced evictions in Palestine. In May 2021, Kattan and her company, Huda Beauty donated $100,000 dollars to Help India Breathe, a COVID-19 relief fundraiser launched by former monk Jay Shetty and his wife, Radhika Devlukia-Shetty.

Personal life 
In high school, Kattan met her husband, Christopher Goncalo, who is of Colombian heritage. The couple moved to Dubai in 2006, got married in June 2009, and had their first child, Nour Gisele, in 2011. Kattan is Muslim. One of Kattan's sisters is her business partner, Mona; while another sister manages Kattan's social media, Alya.

References 

Living people
1983 births
American make-up artists
American bloggers
American cosmetics businesspeople
American women company founders
American company founders
American women chief executives
Artists from Oklahoma City
Businesspeople from Dubai
People from Cookeville, Tennessee
American people of Iraqi descent
American Muslims
University of Michigan–Dearborn alumni
American women bloggers
21st-century American women